Rosario "Saro" Urzì (24 February 1913 – 1 November 1979) was an Italian actor. He is best known for his roles in the films In the Name of the Law (1949), The Railroad Man (1956), Seduced and Abandoned (1964), which earned him a Cannes Film Festival Award for Best Actor, and The Godfather (1972).

Biography
Born in Sicily, he moved to Rome to seek his fortune. He met Pietro Germi in 1949 and appears in Germi's In nome della legge, a film for which he won  Nastro d'Argento as Best Supporting Actor. He became Germi's favourite actor, working together with him in Path of Hope (1950), The Railroad Man  (1956), The Facts of Murder (1959),  Alfredo, Alfredo (1972) and most notably  Seduced and Abandoned in 1964.  That film earned him Best Actor awards at the Cannes Film Festival and the Nastro d'Argento the following year.

He acted in Don Camillo sequels, John Huston's Beat the Devil, Luigi Comencini's Bread, Love and Jealousy,  and international films such as Woman of Straw, and Francis Ford Coppola's  The Godfather as Signor Vitelli, father of Michael Corleone's first wife Apollonia.

Selected filmography

 The Dream of Butterfly (1939)
 La conquista dell'aria (1939)
 Senza cielo (1940) - Un portatore
 Tosca (1941) - (uncredited)
 Marco Visconti (1941)
 La compagnia della teppa (1941)
 Pia de' Tolomei (1941)
 A Pistol Shot (1942) - Uno dei servitori alla scampagnata (uncredited)
 Giorno di nozze (1942)
 Odessa in fiamme (1942) - (uncredited)
 Harlem (1943)
 Special Correspondents (1943) - Un soldato
 The Peddler and the Lady (1943) - (uncredited)
 The Innkeeper (1944)
 La freccia nel fianco (1945) - (uncredited)
 Tombolo, paradiso nero (1947)
 Immigrants (1948)
 In the Name of the Law (1949) - Il maresciallo Grifò
 Monastero di Santa Chiara (1949) - Il direttore del teatro
 Hand of Death (1949) - zingaro Marco
 Pact with the Devil (1950) 
 Hawk of the Nile (1950) - Sahid
 Mistress of the Mountains (1950) - sindaco Giusà
 Barrier to the North (1950) - Il brigadiere
 Path of Hope (1950) - Ciccio Ingaggiatore
 Il monello della strada (1950) - Il commissario
 The Crossroads (1951) - Il brigadiere Carmelo Carlin
 La vendetta del corsaro (1951) - Aguirre
 Trieste mia! (1951)
 Black Fire (1951)
 Little World of Don Camillo (1952) - Brusco
 A Mother Returns (1952)
 The Bandit of Tacca Del Lupo (1952) - Police commissioner Siceli
 Fratelli d'Italia (1952) 
 Io, Amleto (1952)
 The Counterfeiters (1953) - Maresciallo Terlizi
 The Return of Don Camillo (1953) - Brusco - il barbiere
 Cronaca di un delitto (1953) - Martino
 Beat the Devil (1953) - Captain of SS Nyanga 
 Rivalry (1953)
 Public Opinion (1954)
 Cañas y barro (1954) - Cañamel
 Bread, Love and Jealousy (1954) - Il capocomico
 I cinque dell'Adamello (1954) - Briscola
 Don Camillo's Last Round (1955) - Brusco, il parucchiere / Brusco, le coiffeur
 La ladra (1955) - Il Caporale
 Motivo in maschera (1955)
 The Railroad Man (1956) - Gigi Liverani
 Engaged to Death (1957) - Tulio
 Marchands de filles (1957)
 Liane, die weiße Sklavin (1957) - Polizist Emilio
 Dinanzi a noi il cielo (1957) - Padre di Tom
 A Man of Straw (1958) - Beppe
 Romarei, das Mädchen mit den grünen Augen (1958) - Koch Peppino
 Nella città l'inferno (1959) - Maresciallo del carcere
 Son of the Red Corsair (1959) - Mendoza
 I mafiosi (1959)
 The Facts of Murder (1959) - Maresciallo Saro
 Seven in the Sun (1960) - Fernand
 Ça va être ta fête (1960) - Alvarez
 Cavalcata selvaggia (1960)
 Les filles sèment le vent (1961) - Buonacasa
 A Day for Lionhearts (1961) - Il sergente
 Don Camillo: Monsignor (1961) - 	Brusco, il sindaco
 Liane, die Tochter des Dschungels (1961)
 Lo sgarro (1962)
 Divorzio alla siciliana (1963)
 Seduced and Abandoned (1964) - Don Vincenzo Ascalone
 The Sucker (1965) - Tagliella, un garagiste à Naples (uncredited)
 Don Camillo in Moscow (1965) - Brusco
 Mission to Caracas (1965) - Emile Vasson
 Le Chant du monde (1965) - Carle
 Fortuna (1966) - Monsieur Simon
 Me, Me, Me... and the Others (1966) - 2nd Praying Man
 Modesty Blaise (1966) - Basilio 
 The Road to Corinthe (1967) - Kalhides 
 Gente d'onore (1967)
 Vivre la nuit (1968)
 Serafino (1968) - Uncle Agenore
 Un caso di coscienza (1970) - Pharmacist
 La prima notte del dottor Danieli, industriale, col complesso del... giocattolo (1970) - The doctor
 Le inibizioni del dottor Gaudenzi, vedovo, col complesso della buonanima (1971) - John Cardaci
 The Godfather (1972) - Signor Vitelli - Sicilian Sequence
 Alfredo, Alfredo (1972) - Maria Rosa's father
 Black Turin (1972) - Jaco 
 Il caso Pisciotta (1972) - Don Vincenzo Coluzzi
 Sgarro alla camorra (1973)
 Il figlioccio del padrino (1973) - Don Salvatore Trizzino
 Il sergente Rompiglioni diventa... caporale (1975) - Corporal Martucci
 Giovannino (1976) - Giovannino's father
 Occhio alla vedova! (1976)

References

External links
 

1913 births
1979 deaths
20th-century Italian male actors
Italian male actors
Italian film directors
Actors from Catania
Cannes Film Festival Award for Best Actor winners
Nastro d'Argento winners